Elpida Englezou (born 14 November 2006) is a Greek rhythmic gymnast, member of the national senior team.

Career 
Englezou was part of the junior group that competed at the 2021 European Championships in Varna, along Eftychia Dodekatou, Rafailia Fourli, Eirini Chrysovalanto Konisti, Marieta Topollai and Ioanna Triantafyllopoulou, finishing 11th in the All-Around.

In 2022 she entered the rooster of the Greek senior team debuting at the World Cup in Athens, where the group won silver in the All-Around and with 3 ribbons and 2 balls as well as being 4th with 5 hoops. In April she competed at the World Cup in Sofia, getting another silver medal in the All-Around a gold with 3 ribbons and 2 balls. In early June she attended the Pesaro World Cup, finishing 10th in the All-Around. Two weeks later she competed in her first European Championships as a senior, taking 10th place in the team competition, 7th in the All-Around, 13th with 5 hoops and 7th with 3 ribbons and 2 balls. In September she represented Greece at the World Championships in Sofia along Kalomoira Karoki, Aikaterini Pagoulatou, Christina Ourania Riga,Marieta Topollai and the two individuals Panagiota Lytra and Maria Dervisi, ending 10th in the All-Around, 11th with 5 hoops and 9th with 3 ribbons and 2 balls.

References 

Living people
2006 births
Greek rhythmic gymnasts
Gymnasts from Athens